Subotica is a city and municipality in Vojvodina, northern Serbia.

Subotica may also refer to:

Places
Subotica (Aleksandrovac), village in the Aleksandrovac municipality of the Rasina District
Subotica (Banja Luka), village in the municipality of Banja Luka, in Bosnia and Herzegovina
Subotica, Koceljeva, village in the Koceljeva municipality of the Mačva District
Subotica (Svilajnac), village in the Svilajnac municipality of the Pomoravlje District
Banatska Subotica, village in Bela Crkva municipality, Serbia
Mala Subotica, village in Međimurje County, Croatia
Subotica Podravska, village in Koprivnica-Križevci County, Croatia

Other uses
Subotica (horse)